Jenő Buzánszky (4 May 1925 – 11 January 2015) was a Hungarian football player and coach. He played as a right back for Hungary and during the 1950s he was a member of the legendary squad known as the Golden Team. Other members of the team included Ferenc Puskás, Zoltán Czibor, Sándor Kocsis, József Bozsik and Nándor Hidegkuti. He was the only member of the team not to play for either Honvéd or MTK Hungária FC. After 274 league games he retired as a player and became a coach. In 1996, he became a deputy chairman of the Hungarian Football Federation.

Buzánszky made his debut for Hungary on 12 November 1950 in a 1–1 draw with Bulgaria. He subsequently played 48 times for Hungary and as one of the legendary Mighty Magyars, he helped Hungary become Olympic Champions in 1952 and become Central European Champions in 1953. He also played in the Hungary team that defeated England twice. During the 1954 World Cup he played for Hungary in all five games. He died after a long illness on 11 January 2015, aged 89. He was the last surviving member of the Mighty Magyars team.

Honours
Hungary
Olympic Champions
1952
Central European Champions
1953
World Cup
Runner-up: 1954

References

External links

Hungary stats

1925 births
2015 deaths
People from Dombóvár
Hungarian footballers
Association football defenders
Hungary international footballers
Footballers at the 1952 Summer Olympics
Olympic footballers of Hungary
Olympic gold medalists for Hungary
1954 FIFA World Cup players
Pécsi VSK footballers
Dorogi FC footballers
Hungarian football managers
Olympic medalists in football
Medalists at the 1952 Summer Olympics
Sportspeople from Tolna County